The discography of South Korean girl group Ladies' Code consists of four extended plays, two single albums and eleven singles.

Extended plays

Single albums

Singles

Other charted songs

Soundtrack appearances

Compilation appearances

Music videos

References

Discographies of South Korean artists
K-pop music group discographies
Discography